Wajdi Bouallègue (born in Tunis on 9 February 1982) is a Tunisian gymnast. He was the only Tunisian gymnast that competed in the 2004 Summer Olympics and the 2012 Summer Olympics. Wajdi Bouallègue holds a record of 23 gold African medals and has achieved 5 gold medals in a single African championship in Senegal Dakar 2004 (record). He's the only Arab and African gymnast that qualified for 2 consecutive World Cup finals(São Paulo 2006-Madrid 2008).He was elected the best Tunisian sportsmen of the year 2006.

References 

Gymnasts at the 2004 Summer Olympics
Gymnasts at the 2012 Summer Olympics
Sportspeople from Tunis
1982 births
Tunisian male artistic gymnasts
Olympic gymnasts of Tunisia
Living people
Mediterranean Games gold medalists for Tunisia
Mediterranean Games silver medalists for Tunisia
Mediterranean Games bronze medalists for Tunisia
Competitors at the 2005 Mediterranean Games
Competitors at the 2009 Mediterranean Games
Competitors at the 2013 Mediterranean Games
Mediterranean Games medalists in gymnastics
21st-century Tunisian people
20th-century Tunisian people